Millthrop is a hamlet in the South Lakeland district of Cumbria, Northern England and the Yorkshire Dales. Millthrop lies on the south bank of the River Rawthey close to the town of Sedbergh.

See also

Listed buildings in Sedbergh

References

Hamlets in Cumbria
South Lakeland District